HNoMS Haakon VII  may refer to the following Royal Norwegian Navy ships:

 , an escort ship in service from 1942 to 1951
 , a training ship in service from 1958 to 1974

Royal Norwegian Navy ship names